The 1989 World Table Tennis Championships – Swaythling Cup (men's team) was the 40th edition of the men's team championship.

Sweden won the gold medal defeating China 5–0 in the final. The final was interrupted during the fourth game when Jiang Jialiang refused to play on against Jan-Ove Waldner after being called for a service foul. After a delay the match continued but Jiang was booed for the remainder of the match. North Korea won the bronze medal defeating the Soviet Union 5–3 in the bronze medal play off.

Medalists

Swaythling Cup tables

Group A

Group B

Group C

Group D

Quarter finals

Semifinals

Third-place playoff

Final

See also
List of World Table Tennis Championships medalists

References

-